Punchbowl is an alternative spelling of punch bowl, a large bowl for serving drinks, or may refer to:

Topography
Punchbowl, a type of waterfall

Places
 Punchbowl, Korea, valley and site of 1950s battles
Punchbowl, New South Wales, suburb of Sydney, Australia
Punchbowl, Tasmania, suburb of Launceston, Australia
 Punchbowl Cemetery, formally National Memorial Cemetery of the Pacific in Oahu, Hawaii, US
Punchbowl Crater, volcanic remnant in Oahu, Hawaii, US

Other uses
Punchbowl, a fictional city in Stubbs the Zombie
 Battle of the Punchbowl, a 1951 engagement of the Korean War
Punchbowl.com, an online invitations service and digital greeting cards site

See also
Punch bowl (disambiguation)
Devil's Punch Bowl (disambiguation)